Cradock Provincial Hospital is a Provincial government funded hospital for the Inxuba Yethemba Local Municipality area in Cradock, Eastern Cape in South Africa.

The hospital departments include Emergency department, Paediatric ward, Maternity ward, Out Patients Department, Surgical Services, Medical Services, Operating Theatre & CSSD Services, Pharmacy, Anti-Retroviral (ARV) treatment for HIV/AIDS, Post Trauma Counseling Services, X-ray Services, Physiotherapy, NHLS Laboratory, Laundry Services, Kitchen Services and Mortuary.

References
 Cradock Provincial Hospital

Hospitals in the Eastern Cape
Chris Hani District Municipality